Partners in Crime is a novel by British author Nigel Hinton which was first published in 2003. It follows the story of three old school friends who made money from drug dealing and loved the same girl which caused a rift between them.

Concept
The novel is based on a very old folk song about betrayal and murder. The author then thought of the idea of three boys who met in primary school and led a tough life.

Award
In 2014 the novel won the Coventry Inspiration Book Award in the category Fancy a Quickie for adults.

Synopsis
Perry Grant is the only one to know the truth about how his two best friends died.

References

2003 British novels
Novels by Nigel Hinton